Bloon may refer to:
 Bloon, an enemy in the Bloons video games
 Bloon, a proposed balloon-based aircraft by Zero 2 Infinity